Nicola Ippoliti (died 1511) was a Roman Catholic prelate who served as Archbishop (Personal Title) of Ariano (1498–1511),
Archbishop (Personal Title) of Città di Castello (1493–1498),
Archbishop of Rossano (1481–1493), and Bishop of Ariano (1480–1481).

Biography
On 14 July 1480, Nicola Ippoliti was appointed during the papacy of Pope Sixtus IV as Bishop of Ariano.
On 5 September 1481, he was appointed during the papacy of Pope Sixtus IV as Archbishop of Rossano.
On 13 January 1493, he was appointed during the papacy of Pope Alexander VI as Archbishop (Personal Title) of Città di Castello.
On 10 January 1498, he was re-appointed during the papacy of Pope Alexander VI as Archbishop (Personal Title) of Ariano.
He served as Bishop of Ariano until his death in 1511.

References

External links and additional sources
 (for Chronology of Bishops) 
 (for Chronology of Bishops) 
 (for Chronology of Bishops) 
 (for Chronology of Bishops) 
 (for Chronology of Bishops)
 (for Chronology of Bishops)

15th-century Italian Roman Catholic bishops
16th-century Italian Roman Catholic archbishops
Bishops appointed by Pope Sixtus IV
Bishops appointed by Pope Alexander VI
Bishops of Ariano
1511 deaths